
Year 392 BC was a year of the pre-Julian Roman calendar. At the time, it was known as the Year of the Consulship of Poplicola and Capitolinus (or, less frequently, year 362 Ab urbe condita). The denomination 392 BC for this year has been used since the early medieval period, when the Anno Domini calendar era became the prevalent method in Europe for naming years.

Events 
 By place 
 Persian Empire 
 The Persian general, Struthas is dispatched by King Artaxerxes II to take command of the satrapy of Sardis, replacing Tiribazus, and to pursue an anti-Spartan policy.

 Greece 
 During the Corinthian War, the Spartans dispatch an ambassador, Antalcidas, to the Persian satrap Tiribazus, hoping to turn the Persians against the allies by informing them of Conon's use of the Persian fleet to begin rebuilding the Athenian empire. Learning of this, the Athenians send an embassy led by Conon to present their case to the Persians at Sardis. Alarmed by Conon's actions, Tiribazus arrests him, and secretly provides the Spartans with money to equip a fleet. Although Conon quickly escapes, he dies in Cyprus without returning to Athens.
 A peace conference between the Greek city-states is held in Sparta. Andocides, Athenian orator and politician, goes with three colleagues to negotiate peace with Sparta. The conference is unsuccessful and Athens rejects the terms and exiles the ambassadors.

 Sicily 
 Dionysius I of Syracuse, having increased his power over the native Sicilians (Sicels), is now attacked by a second Carthaginian expedition. He is forced to ally himself with the Sicels. The Carthaginian army, under Mago II, is defeated, makes peace, and returns to Carthage. The treaty with Carthage is advantageous to Dionysius.

 By topic 
 Art 
 Isocrates sets up a school of rhetoric in Chios.

Births

Deaths 
 Conon, Athenian general (approximate date)

References